Coelacanth National Park (French: Parc National Coelacanth) is a national park off the main island of the Comoros. The park is made up a seascape home to coelacanths and a coral reef which attracts whales and dolphins. Its creation was announced in 2016 as part of a government effort to protect 25% of the Comoros by 2021.

References

National parks of the Comoros